Ken Schaphorst (born May 24, 1960 in Abington, Pennsylvania) is a composer, performer, and educator.

Career
Before moving to Boston in 2001, Schaphorst served as Director of Jazz Studies at Lawrence University in Appleton, Wisconsin for ten years. Schaphorst is also a founding member of the Jazz Composers Alliance, a Boston-based non-profit corporation promoting new music in the jazz idiom since 1985.

Schaphorst studied at Swarthmore College, New England Conservatory of Music, and Boston University, where he received the Doctor of Musical Arts in 1990. His composition teachers have included Thomas Oboe Lee, Gerald Levinson, William Thomas McKinley and Bernard Rands.

Schaphorst was awarded composition fellowships from the National Endowment for the Arts in 1988 and 1991, the Wisconsin Arts Board in 1997, Meet the Composer Grants in 1987 and 1997, and was a Music Composition finalist in the Massachusetts Fellowship Program in 1986.

Discography
 Making Lunch (1989)
 After Blue (1991)
 When the Moon Jumps (1994)
 Over the Rainbow (1997)
 Purple (Naxos, 1999)
 Premieres 2000 (Mark Masters, 2001)
 Indigenous Technology (2002)
 How to Say Goodbye (2016)

References 

 Kernfeld, Barry (ed.) (2003) "Schaphorst, Kenneth William" The New Grove Dictionary of Jazz (2nd rev.) Oxford University Press, Oxford,

External links 
Ken Schaphorst website
Ken Schaphorst page at NEC
Ken Schaphorst bio at allmusic.com
Ken Schaphorst page at allaboutjazz.com

New England Conservatory faculty
American jazz composers
American male jazz composers
Living people
Lawrence University faculty
1960 births